Corallibacter is a Gram-negative, strictly aerobic and heterotrophic genus of bacteria from the family of Flavobacteriaceae with one known species (Corallibacter vietnamensis).

References

Flavobacteria
Bacteria genera
Monotypic bacteria genera
Taxa described in 2012